Myotherapy is a form of muscle therapy which focuses on the assessment, treatment and rehabilitation of musculoskeletal pain and associated pathologies.  The term myotherapy was originally coined by Bonnie Prudden to describe a specific type of trigger point therapy which she developed in the 1970s based on the earlier work of Travell and Simons who researched the cause and treatment of pain arising from myofascial trigger points. While based on rational principles, there is little scientific research regarding the efficacy of this therapy, so it remains controversial within the medical and academic disciplines.

Over the ensuing 40 years, myotherapy has evolved to become an allied health discipline which is practised in many countries across the world including the UK, Australia, USA, Canada, Malaysia, and Thailand.

Myotherapy incorporates trigger point therapy and a wide range of soft tissue massage and manipulation including muscle energy technique, dry needling, and joint mobilization. Myotherapists also use stretching, nutritional advice, exercise prescription, postural advice and education, heat and cold therapy, ultrasound and TENS.

Definition 
Myotherapy is a branch of manual medicine focused on the treatment and rehabilitation of musculoskeletal pain and associated conditions. It involves a physical evaluation and an integrated therapeutic approach to affected muscles, joints, nerves, and associated viscera (organs) and is used in the treatment of acute or chronic conditions and in preventative management. Myotherapy is a form of physical therapy treatment for most common musculoskeletal conditions that result from improper posture, poor biomechanics and injury.  Myotherapy is defined as: "the comprehensive assessment, treatment, and management of neuromusculoskeletal disorders and conditions caused by improper biomechanical functioning."
Myotherapists take into account all aspects of health and wellness to treat patients - this includes not only physical but psychological and occupational aspects of the individual.

Myotherapists are trained manual therapy professionals in the field of myofascial pain and dysfunction (pain that arises from the muscles and surrounding connective tissue).

Myotherapists assess and treat the connective tissue (muscle, tendons, ligaments, joint capsules, tissue coverings) using mostly direct 'hands-on' techniques.  Some myotherapists are also trained in the use of TENS machines, lasers, ultrasound, rehabilitation aids, taping, dry needling, and exercise prescriptions for rehabilitation.

Myotherapy treatments incorporate the following:
 a thorough patient history,
 observations of tissues, movement, and gait,
 postural assessment,
 palpation of spine, peripheral joints, musculature, connective tissue and associated viscera,

Myotherapy plays a role in manual medicine as a single mode of treatment, or is used in conjunction with treatment provided by both medical and other allied-health practitioners such as physiotherapy, podiatry, chiropractic, osteopathy, and acupuncture/TCM.

History 

Myotherapy was developed by Bonnie Prudden, an American exercise and fitness expert and author of a number of books, including Pain Erasure. She created a new system of Manual Therapy based on the work of Janet Travell.   Myotherapy is based on the research of Janet Travell and David Simons who established the neuro-physiological basis of myofascial pain and dysfunction, and has evolved to include the assessment techniques and treatment modalities.

Modalities 

All modalities are used with the specific purpose of achieving a therapeutic outcome. None of these modalities were used by Bonnie Prudden, the developer of Myotherapy. She proposed only manual medicine based on trigger points and corrective exercise techniques.  The use of muscle energy techniques, dry needling, joint mobilization, nutritional advice, heat and cold therapy, ultrasound and TENS are not a part of the practice of certified Bonnie Prudden myotherapists.

Soft Tissue Therapy is the use of the hands to target specific areas of dysfunction for the purpose of a therapeutic outcome. Techniques may include therapeutic massage, muscle energy techniques, neuromuscular techniques, positional release techniques, myofascial release techniques, trigger point therapy, lymphatic drainage techniques and joint mobilisation.

Temperature Therapies is the application of either heat (thermal therapy) or cold (cryotherapy). Techniques may include heat packs, cold packs, ice baths, whirlpools, heat lamps, and paraffin wax baths.

Electromechanical Stimulation is the application of electrical currents or soundwaves to produce a healing and/or analgesic (pain-modifying) outcome. Techniques include TENS therapy, interferential technique, therapeutic ultrasound and low level laser therapy.

Myofascial Dry-Needling (MDN) is the application of fine filiform needles (which are also used by but not exclusive to acupuncture) into specific points in the muscles known as trigger points, to produce a healing and analgesic (pain-modifying) outcome.

Myofascial Stretching is the application of a range of stretching techniques, used to elongate the muscle fibres, return functionally short muscles to their optimal length and increase the range of motion of a joint, leading to prevention of further injury. Techniques may include static stretching, dynamic stretching and proprioceptive neuromuscular facilitation stretching (PNF).

Rehabilitative Exercise and Corrective Actions are seen as central components of any myotherapy treatment. Proponents claim they enable the client to take responsibility for their own health, act to permanently change dysfunctional patterns, and prevent injury. Techniques may include core stability and Swiss Ball, hydrotherapy neuromusculoskeletal rehabilitative programs, biomechanical retraining, nutrition, injury prevention, and lifestyle education.

Effectiveness 
In 2015 the Australian Government's Department of Health published the results of a review of alternative therapies that sought to determine if any were suitable for being covered by health insurance; "Massage therapy or myotherapy" was one of 17 therapies evaluated for which no clear evidence of effectiveness was found. The report found that the overall quality of the trial was poor, although highlighted that there was moderate quality evidence of success with certain patients. The report concluded that "the effectiveness of massage therapy within this population remains uncertain. No studies were identified that assessed the effect of myotherapy in people with a clinical condition, and the effectiveness of this therapy is therefore unknown."

References

Further reading 

Gunn C.C.; 2007, The Gunn Approach to the Treatment of Chronic Pain – Intramuscular Stimulation for Myofascial Pain of Radiculopathic Origin, 2nd edn., Churchill Livingstone, CN
Jamison J.R.; 2006, Differential Diagnosis for Primary Care – a handbook for health care practitioners, 2nd edn., Elsevier, LON
Kendall, F.P. et al. 2005, Muscles Testing and Function with Posture and Pain, 5th edn., Lippincott Williams & Wilkins, USA
Magee D.J.; 2006, Orthopedic Physical Assessment, 4th edn., Saunders Elsevier, USA
Petty N.J. & Moore A.P.; 2002, Neuromusculoskeletal Examination and Assessment – A Handbook for Therapists, 2nd edn., Churchill Livingstone/Elsevier Science Ltd., CN
Travell J.G. & Simons D.G.; 1999, Myofascial Pain and Dysfunction – The Trigger Point Manual: Volume 1. Upper Half of Body, 2nd edn., Lippincott Williams & Wilkins, USA
Travell J.G. & Simons D.G.; 1993, Myofascial Pain and Dysfunction – The Trigger Point Manual: Volume 2. The Lower Extremities, Lippincott Williams & Wilkins, USA
Tritton, B.; 1996, Massage and Myotherapy, 2nd edn., RMIT Publishing, AUS

Manual therapy
Allied health professions